Charles Talbot, 1st Duke of Shrewsbury, KG, PC (15 July 16601 February 1718) was an English peer and politician who was part of the Immortal Seven group which invited William of Orange to depose King James II of England during the Glorious Revolution. He was appointed to several minor roles before the revolution, but came to prominence as a member of William's government.  Born to Roman Catholic parents, he remained in that faith until 1679 when—during the time of the Popish Plot and following the advice of the divine John Tillotson—he converted to the Church of England. Shrewsbury took his seat in the House of Lords in 1680 and three years later was appointed Gentleman-Extraordinary of the Bedchamber, suggesting he was in favour at the court of Charles II.

With the accession in 1685 of James II, Shrewsbury was appointed a captain in order to defeat the Monmouth rebellion, although he resigned his commission in 1687 after refusing to bow to pressure from James to convert back to the Catholic faith. Making contact with William of Orange, Shrewsbury's home became a meeting place for the opposition to James II and Shrewsbury was one of seven English statesmen to sign the invitation to William to invade England in June 1688. In September he fled England for Holland and returned with William to England in November. Shrewsbury was influential in the making of the Revolution Settlement, arguing strongly in favour of recognising William and Mary as sovereigns. Shrewsbury resigned from William's government in 1690 due to ill health and his opposition to the dissolution of Parliament and the dropping of the Bill that would have required an oath abjuring James as King. In opposition, Shrewsbury contacted the exiled Stuart court in France as a prelude to a Stuart restoration. In 1694, Shrewsbury returned to government and was prominent in persuading the House of Commons to vote for the funds needed for William's war against France. Ill health led to his resignation in 1698, but he returned to the government in 1699 until resigning again in 1700.

From 1700 until 1705, Shrewsbury was in self-imposed exile abroad, during which he married Countess Adelhida Paleotti. In April 1710 Shrewsbury return to government and was an early supporter of the Tory efforts to negotiate peace with France to end the War of the Spanish Succession, concerned at the negative financial impact it was having on landowners. However, he was uncomfortable with peace negotiations that left out Britain's ally, the Dutch. In November 1712 he was appointed ambassador to France and then Lord Lieutenant of Ireland, returning to England in June 1714.

In July Shrewsbury was appointed Lord Treasurer but in August Queen Anne died and George I succeeded her. The new Whig regime opposed Shrewsbury remaining in government and by 1715 he had lost all his governmental offices, although until his death he remained George's Groom of the Stool. Shrewsbury opposed the Whigs' attack on the previous Tory ministers and opposed their other policies in the Lords, making contact with the Stuart Pretender and sending him money. He died in 1718.

Early life and family

He was the only son of the 11th Earl of Shrewsbury and his second wife, formerly Anna Maria Brudenell, a daughter of the 2nd Earl of Cardigan. His mother became the notorious mistress of the 2nd Duke of Buckingham, who killed her husband in a duel in 1668. It has been argued that the traumatic events of his early childhood left a permanent mark on him. Talbot was a godson of King Charles II, after whom he was named, and he was brought up as a Roman Catholic, but after the scandal of his father's death, he was placed in the care of Protestant relatives. In 1679, under the influence of John Tillotson, he became a member of the Church of England.

Under Charles II and James II

On his father's death he succeeded to the Earldom of Shrewsbury, received an appointment in the household of Charles II, and served in the army under James II. Nonetheless, in 1687 he was in correspondence with the Prince of Orange, and he was one of the seven signatories of the letter of invitation to William in the following year. He contributed towards defraying the expenses of the projected invasion, and having crossed to Holland to join William, he landed with him in England in November 1688 during the Glorious Revolution.

The Glorious Revolution and William III

Shrewsbury became Secretary of State for the Southern Department in the first administration of William and Mary, succeeding his uncle the Earl of Middleton, but he resigned from office in 1690 when the Tories gained the upper hand in parliament. While in opposition he brought forward the Triennial Bill, to which the King initially refused assent. In 1694 he again became Secretary of State; but there is evidence that as early as 1690, when he resigned, he had made overtures to the Jacobites and was in correspondence with James at his court in exile at Saint Germain, though it has been stated on the other hand that these relations were entered upon with William's full connivance, for reasons of policy. Others aver that Shrewsbury himself was unaware of the King's knowledge and toleration, which would explain the terrifying letters he was in the habit of penning to him.

However this may be, William affected to have no suspicion of Shrewsbury's loyalty, although often presented with evidence against him. On 30 April 1694 Shrewsbury was created Marquess of Alton and Duke of Shrewsbury, and he acted as one of the regents during the King's absence from England in the two following years. In 1696 definite accusations of treason were brought against him by Sir John Fenwick, which William immediately communicated to Shrewsbury; and about this time the Secretary of State took but a small part in public business, again professing his anxiety to resign. His plea of ill health was a genuine one, and in 1700 the King reluctantly consented to his retirement into private life.

Exile

For the next seven years Shrewsbury lived abroad, chiefly at Rome, whence in 1701 he wrote a celebrated letter to Lord Somers expressing his abhorrence of public life and declaring that if he had a son he "would sooner bind him to a cobbler than a courtier, and a hangman than a statesman". He also visited France and Switzerland.

Recalled from exile and the accession of Anne

On the accession of Queen Anne the Whig leaders made an ineffectual attempt to persuade Shrewsbury to return to office. He returned at last to England on 30 December 1705. Upon his return to England, Shrewsbury concentrated on the construction of Heythrop Park.

Lord Chamberlain and Lord Treasurer
He took his seat in the House of Lords in January 1706. He gradually became alienated from his old political associates, and in 1710 he accepted the post of Lord Chamberlain in the Tory administration, to which the queen appointed him without the knowledge of Godolphin and Marlborough; his wife was at the same time made a Lady of the Bedchamber.

After a diplomatic mission to France for the purpose of negotiating preliminaries of peace, Shrewsbury became Lord Lieutenant of Ireland in 1713; but he was in London in July 1714 during the memorable crisis occasioned by the impending death of Queen Anne. On 29 July, when the queen was dying, the Earl of Oxford received his long-delayed dismissal from the office of Lord Treasurer. On 30 July, Shrewsbury and other ministers assembled at Kensington Palace and, being admitted to the queen's bedchamber, Bolingbroke recommended the appointment of Shrewsbury to the vacant treasurership; Anne at once placed the staff of that high office in the duke's hands. He was to be the very last person to hold that position but the first to have been Lord Lieutenant of Ireland, Lord Chamberlain and Lord Treasurer at the same time.

Accession of George I

Thus, when the queen died on 1 August, Shrewsbury was in a position of supreme power with reference to the momentous question of the succession to the crown. He threw his influence into the scale in favour of the Elector of Hanover, and was powerfully influential in bringing about the peaceful accession of George I, and in defeating the design of the Jacobites to place the son of James II on the throne. His disinclination for the highest political offices remained, however, as great as before; and having resigned the lord-treasurership and the lord-lieutenancy of Ireland, he was appointed Lord Chamberlain. This place he resigned in July 1715.

Legacy

The Duke of Shrewsbury was one of the greatest noblemen of the reign of Queen Anne. Though blind in one eye, he was strikingly handsome in person, his demeanour was dignified and his manners full of grace and courtesy. Swift described him as "the finest gentleman we have", and as "the favourite of the nation", while William III spoke of him as "the King of Hearts". Like most of his contemporaries, he endeavoured to keep himself in favour both with the exiled house of Stuart and with the reigning sovereign in England; but at the two critical junctures of 1688 and 1714, he acted decisively in favour of the Protestant succession. At other times he appeared weak and vacillating, and he never wholeheartedly supported either Whigs or Tories, though he co-operated with each in turn. His magnanimous disposition saved him from the vindictiveness of the party politician of the period; and the weak health from which he suffered through life probably combined with a congenital lack of ambition to prevent his grasping the power which his personality and talents might have placed in his hands.

Private life and death

In 1705 Shrewsbury married, at Augsburg, Bavaria, Adelhida Paleotti, daughter of the Marquis Andrea Paleotti by his second wife Maria Cristina Dudley, fifth daughter of Carlo Dudley, titular Duke of Northumberland (himself son of Sir Robert Dudley (1574–1649), an Englishman turned member of the Tuscan nobility). This lady, who is said to have had "a great many engaging qualities" besides many accomplishments, was the subject of much malicious gossip. She was the widow, or as some declared, the mistress of a Count Brachiano; and Lady Cowper reported that the lady's brother had forced Shrewsbury to marry her "after an intrigue together".

After Shrewsbury's return to England, the duchess became conspicuous in London society, where the caustic wit of Lady Mary Wortley Montagu was exercised at her expense. She won the favour of Queen Anne, after the death of Prince George of Denmark, by her impulsive comment: "Oh my poor Queen I see how much you do miss your dear husband". During the Paris embassy, she became extremely popular, due to her hospitality and lively conversation. Saint Simon thought that her eccentricity bordered on madness, but he did praise the simple, practical hairstyle which she made fashionable.

On the accession of George I, the Duchess of Shrewsbury became a lady of the bedchamber to the Princess of Wales, a position which she retained till her death on 29 June 1726. Shrewsbury left no children, and at his death the dukedom became extinct, the earldom of Shrewsbury passing to his cousin Gilbert Talbot. Gilbert was a Roman Catholic priest living abroad and on his death in 1744 the titles and estates devolved on his brother George.

He died at his London home, Warwick House, Charing Cross, on 1 February 1718, from inflammation of the lungs, aged fifty-seven. He was buried in the family tomb at the parish church of Albrighton (near Wolverhampton), Shropshire.

Cultural references
The Duke is the central character in the historical novel, Shrewsbury (1897), by Stanley Weyman. As a minor but pivotal character, he was portrayed by Job Stewart in six episodes of the sprawling ensemble BBC serial The First Churchills (1969).

See also
 William Chaloner
List of deserters from James II to William of Orange

Notes

References

Stuart Handley, ‘Talbot, Charles, duke of Shrewsbury (1660–1718)’, Oxford Dictionary of National Biography, Oxford University Press, 2004; online edn, Jan 2008, retrieved 30 Jan 2011.
Dorothy H. Somerville, The King of Hearts. Charles Talbot, Duke of Shrewsbury (London: George Allen & Unwin, 1962).

Further reading

5th Dragoon Guards officers
British Secretaries of State
Diplomatic peers
Secretaries of State of the Kingdom of England
Garter Knights appointed by William III
Lord High Treasurers
Lord-Lieutenants of Anglesey
Lord-Lieutenants of Caernarvonshire
Lord-Lieutenants of Denbighshire
Lord-Lieutenants of Flintshire
Lord-Lieutenants of Herefordshire
Lord-Lieutenants of Hertfordshire
Lord-Lieutenants of Merionethshire
Lord-Lieutenants of Montgomeryshire
Lord-Lieutenants of Shropshire
Lord-Lieutenants of Staffordshire
Lord-Lieutenants of Worcestershire
People expelled from the Privy Council of England
1660 births
1718 deaths
Charles
Dukes in the Peerage of England
Ambassadors of Great Britain to France
Earls of Shrewsbury
Earls of Waterford
Lords Lieutenant of Ireland
People of the Glorious Revolution